Timpanogos Glacier is a rock glacier located on Mount Timpanogos in the Wasatch Range within the Mount Timpanogos Wilderness (in the Uinta-Wasatch-Cache National Forest) in northeastern Utah County, Utah, United States, and is the last known glacier in Utah.

Description

The glacier is situated on the north slope of Mount Timpanogos. The best evidence indicates that the Timpanogos Glacier was once a "true" glacier with crevasses present in the early 20th century, but that the surface portion was lost during the dust bowl drought of the 1930s and reduced to a permanent snowfield.

The glacier is considered to be a rock glacier, since the remaining ice is buried in the talus. However, in 1994 the rocks parted, revealing a crevasse or meltwater channel in the buried ice. One witness described it as being " thick at least."
Another crevasse reportedly opened up in the late 1990s or early 2000s.
Around this time Brigham Young University dug  down to the ice and attempted to obtain a core sample and study the ice crystal morphology. The core sample was reportedly contaminated and crystal morphology study was unsuccessful.

Today, the rock glacier consists of three flow lobes. The main one may be inactive, the uppermost one is probably active, and the one in-between is probably extinct. On September 3, 2016, an amateur geologist found a meltwater pit in the uppermost flow lobe full of opaque glacial runoff and a small amount of exposed glacial ice. He dug through the rocks in the slope of the pit and found blue ice about  down. The ice contained bubbles and was therefore probably glacial in origin.

Over the years, the glacier has been the site of multiple injuries and several fatalities.

Emerald Lake is a small proglacial lake which lies at the terminal moraine left behind by the now mostly vanished Timpanogos Glacier. The occasional blue color of Emerald Lake is an indicator of the buried glacial ice. Since this color did not appear in 2016 despite low water levels, the main flow lobe of the glacier which touches the lake may now be inactive.

See also
 List of glaciers in the United States
 Retreat of glaciers since 1850

References

External links

Glaciers of Utah
Landforms of Utah County, Utah
Wasatch Range